"There's a New Sound" is a 1953 novelty song by Tony Burrello, written by Burrello and Tom Murray.

Burrello, better known under his birth name Tony Tamburello, a songwriter and jazz pianist, and Murray started writing novelty songs after they were unsuccessful in having their more serious-minded songs recorded by prominent musicians. They noted the success of music that was seemingly intentionally bad, after hearing a disc jockey play Harry Stewart's version of "Yes Sir, That's My Baby" sung in a faux-Japanese accent and featuring a geisha orchestra. According to Murray, the disc jockey said that the record was one of the top hits but also "one of the most horrible records he had ever heard".

Burrello and Murray responded by creating the songs "There's a New Sound" performed by Burello and "Fish" sung by Leona Anderson, which they released as a single. The former song's lyrics consist of a single chorus repeated five times, each time at a higher pitch. The lyrics describe a "new sound ... the strangest sound that you have ever heard", which turns out to be "the sound that's made by worms". Burrello was credited as the artist on the single, which was released on Burrello and Murray's own record label, Horrible, as catalog numbers H 100 (ten-inch 78 rpm format) and H 100-X45 (seven-inch 45 rpm format). It was the Horrible label's first and only release.

When Billboard magazine reviewed the single, it commented, "A weird one. 'The new sound is the sound made by worms.' Strange sound effects go with nonsense lyric. It's a studied attempt to be as screwy as possible. Quien Sabe?" For the flip side, "Fish", Billboard′s review was "Same comment".

Burrello and Murray originally had only 500 copies of "There's a New Sound"/"Fish" issued, to be sent to disc jockeys as a protest record. However, within two weeks, they received orders for more than 100,000 copies of the single.

Soon afterward, Burrello and Murray were called upon to write a song for Brucie Weil, who was then 6 years old. The song they wrote for Weil, "God Bless Us All", reached #18 on the Billboard singles chart.

Burrello and Murray were soon called upon to write music for other artists, including a theme song for John Conte and special material for Tony Bennett.

Anderson went on to exploit her newfound fame as a "horrible" musician (the schtick was a parody of opera singers who, in Anderson's opinion, could never "kid themselves properly (or) let their voices go") by making appearances on The Ernie Kovacs Show and signing with Columbia Records for two more singles. In 1957, for Unique Records, Anderson released a full-length album, Music to Suffer By, in the same style she used for "Fish."

"There's a New Sound" was later featured often on the Dr. Demento show and performed by Scooter on The Muppet Show.

References

Novelty songs
1953 singles
1953 songs
Comedy songs